Jack Arnold Mayes (8 December 1912 — 1994) was an English professional footballer who played as a wing half.

Career
Mayes began his career at Barking in 1932, signing for Crystal Palace the following year. After failing to make an appearance at Crystal Palace, Mayes returned to Barking. In 1935, Mayes signed for Chelsea. Over the course of three seasons, Mayes made 12 Football League appearances at the club before the outbreak of World War II. Mayes later played for Chelmsford City, alongside his brother Ken.

References

1910s births
1994 deaths
Association football midfielders
English footballers
People from Wickford
Barking F.C. players
Crystal Palace F.C. players
Chelsea F.C. players
Chelmsford City F.C. players
English Football League players